"Midnight" / "Choice" is a double A side single released by Orbital. This single was released in the UK in August 1991. "Choice" samples, and takes its name from, the track "Annihilation" by the hardcore punk band Crucifix.

"Midnight" appears on both the UK and US versions of The Green Album, though in different forms: The US edition features an edited version of the track, while the UK edition contains a live version with a significantly different arrangement. "Choice" also appears on the US version of the album.
Early versions of the single feature "Midnight (Sasha Remix)" as track 1, labeled simply as "Midnight". Later editions replace this with a non-remix version of Midnight (presumably the US version) rather than correct the track title.

The third track of the single was "Analogue Test 90"

Remixes

As with all four singles off the first album there was a remix single of Midnight/Choice as well. Track 1 was the Sasha remix of Midnight that had appeared in place of the non-remix version of Midnight on early printings of the Midnight/Choice single. There was also a remix of Choice by British band Eye and I.

Record cover design

The record sleeve was designed by the usual Orbital collaborator Gavin Fultano (Fultano 90). The cover features a label diagram of a dissected eye.

Track listings

7" vinyl record

A  "Midnight (Radio Edit)" (3:20)
AA "Choice (Radio Edit)"   (3:24)

12" vinyl record

A  "Midnight" 
AA "Choice"

12" Remix

A  "Midnight (Sasha Remix)"
AA "Choice (Eye and I Remix)"

CD single

"Midnight"
"Choice"
"Analogue Test Feb 90"

References

1991 songs
Orbital (band) songs
FFRR Records singles